The East Germanic languages, also called the Oder–Vistula Germanic languages, are a group of extinct Germanic languages that were spoken by East Germanic peoples. East Germanic is one of the primary branches of Germanic languages, along with North Germanic and West Germanic. 

The only East Germanic language of which texts are known is Gothic, although a word list and some short sentences survive from its relative Crimean Gothic. Other East Germanic languages include Vandalic and Burgundian, though the only remnants of these languages are in the form of isolated words and short phrases. Furthermore, the inclusion of Burgundian has been called into doubt. Crimean Gothic is believed to have survived until the 18th century in isolated areas of Crimea.

History

East Germanic was presumably native to the north of Central Europe, especially modern Poland, and likely even the first branch to split off from Proto-Germanic in the first millennium BCE.

For many years, the least controversial theory of the origin of the Germanic (and East Germanic) languages was the so-called Gotho-Nordic hypothesis: that they originated in the Nordic Bronze Age of Southern Scandinavia and along the coast of the northernmost parts of Germany.

By the 1st century CE, the writings of Pomponius Mela, Pliny the Elder, and Tacitus indicate a division of Germanic-speaking peoples into large groupings with shared ancestry and culture. (This division has been taken over in modern terminology about the divisions of Germanic languages.)

Based on accounts by Jordanes, Procopius, Paul the Deacon and others, as well as linguistic, toponymic, and archaeological evidence, the East Germanic tribes, the speakers of the East Germanic languages related to the North Germanic tribes, had migrated from Scandinavia into the area lying east of the Elbe. In fact, the Scandinavian influence on Pomerania and today's northern Poland from c. 1300–1100 BCE (Nordic Bronze Age sub-period III) onwards was so considerable that this region is sometimes included in the Nordic Bronze Age culture (Dabrowski 1989:73).

There is also archaeological and toponymic evidence which has been taken as suggesting that Burgundians lived on the Danish island of Bornholm, and that Rugians lived on the Norwegian coast of Rogaland.

See also
 Ingvaeonic languages  
 Irminonic languages  
 Istvaeonic languages  
 North Germanic languages  
 West Germanic languages
 Balto-Slavic languages

References

Sources
 Dabrowski, J. (1989) Nordische Kreis und Kulturen Polnischer Gebiete. Die Bronzezeit im Ostseegebiet. Ein Rapport der Kgl. Schwedischen Akademie der Literatur, Geschichte und Altertumsforschung über das Julita-Symposium 1986. Ed Ambrosiani, Björn Kungl. Vitterhets Historie och Antikvitets Akademien. Konferenser 22. Stockholm. 
 Demougeot, E. La formation de l'Europe et les invasions barbares, Paris: Editions Montaigne, 1969–74.
 Hartmann, Frederik / Riegger, Ciara. 2021. The Burgundian language and its phylogeny - A cladistical investigation. Nowele 75, p. 42-80.
Kaliff, Anders. 2001. Gothic Connections. Contacts between eastern Scandinavia and the southern Baltic coast 1000 BCE – 500 CE.
 Musset, L. Les invasions: les vagues germanique, Paris: Presses universitaires de France, 1965.
 Nordgren, I. 2004. Well Spring of The Goths. About the Gothic Peoples in the Nordic Countries and on the Continent.
“Gothic Language.” Encyclopædia Britannica, Encyclopædia Britannica, Inc., 20 July 1998, https://www.britannica.com/topic/Gothic-language.

 
Extinct languages of Europe
Extinct Germanic languages